Daniel Desmond (1833–1903) was an Irish-American retail store owner.

Daniel Desmond may also refer to:

 Dan Desmond (1913–1964), Irish politician
 Daniel Francis Desmond (1884–1945), American prelate of the Roman Catholic Church